Sorbey may refer to the following places in France:

 Sorbey, Meuse, a commune in the Meuse department
 Sorbey, Moselle, a commune in the Moselle department